The men's 400 metre freestyle competition of the swimming events at the 1987 Pan American Games took place on 13 August at the Indiana University Natatorium. The last Pan American Games champion was Bruce Hayes of US.

This race consisted of eight lengths of the pool, with all eight being in the freestyle stroke.

Results
All times are in minutes and seconds.

Heats

Final 
The final was held on August 13.

References

Swimming at the 1987 Pan American Games